Spangenberg is a small town in northeastern Hesse, Germany.

Geography 
Spangenberg is the demographic centrepoint of Germany.

History 
The town of Spangenberg had its first documented mention in 1261, at about the time when the Treffurt family ruled Spangenberg.

Historic sights 

The town is known best of all for Spangenberg Castle, built in 1253 and the town's landmark. Also worth seeing are the half-timbered buildings in the Old Town and the remains of the town's old wall, several of whose towers are still standing.

In World War II, Spangenberg Castle was used as a prisoner of war camp, Oflag IX-A/H. There was a second camp a few miles to the south - Oflag IX-A-Z.

Coat of arms 
Spangenberg's civic coat of arms is based on the town's oldest known seal from 1317. The object on the viewer's right (heraldically speaking, the left, as the shield is considered from the point of view of the bearer) side is a kind of fossilized plant locally known as a Spange (also German for "brooch" or "clip"), the town's namesake. The item on the viewer's left (heraldic right) is half of a wheel. Wheels are common in German civic heraldry, usually indicating some connection to the Archbishopric of Mainz, whose arms include wheels in honor of St. Willigis.  The current colours – red and gold – have been in use since 1621.

Constituent communities 
In alphabetical order, these are Bergheim, Bischofferode, Elbersdorf, Herlefeld, Kaltenbach, Landefeld, Metzebach, Mörshausen, Nausis, Pfieffe, Schnellrode, Vockerode-Dinkelberg and Weidelbach.

Partnerships 
Spangenberg maintains partnerships with the following places:
  Treffurt, Thuringia since 1990
  Saint-Pierre-d'Oléron, Charente-Maritime, France since 1997
  Pleszew, Poland since 1997

 Henry II, Landgrave of Hesse (before 1302-1376), Landgraf, resided at Schloss Spangenberg
 Hermann II, Landgrave of Hesse (1341-1413), Landgraf, resided at the castle
 William I, Landgrave of Lower Hesse (1466-1515), Landgraf, died at Schloss Spangenberg
 Philip I, Landgrave of Hesse (1504-1567), Landgraf, lived at Schloss Spangenberg
 William IV, Landgrave of Hesse-Kassel (1532-1592), Landgraf, gave the castle its present form
 Margarethe von der Saale (1522-1566), sister of Philip the Magnanimous, lived in the castle seat, her grave is in the city church of St. John
 Hans Wilhelm Kirchhof (1525-1605), Burggraf on Schloss Spangenberg
 Michael Rutschky (born 1943), writer, grew up in Spangenberg

References

External links 
 Spangenberg

Schwalm-Eder-Kreis